Brzeziniec may refer to the following places in Poland:
Brzeziniec, Lower Silesian Voivodeship (south-west Poland)
Brzeziniec, Pomeranian Voivodeship (north Poland)